Too Much Johnson is a lost 1919 American silent comedy film produced by Famous Players-Lasky and distributed by Paramount Pictures. It was directed by Donald Crisp during his phase as an important film director. This film stars in the leads Bryant Washburn and Lois Wilson.

This film is based on William Gillette's 1894 play Too Much Johnson and is the second film attempt at the play, the first having been a short in 1900. Famously, Orson Welles made a short and unfinished amateur version of the play and he may have not known of this feature silent from 1919.

Plot
As described in a film magazine, Augustus Billings (Washburn), who lives in deadly fear of his mother-in-law Mrs. Batterson (Farrington), risks fate by taking a yacht trip with his friend Billy Lounsberry (Blue), who owns some oil wells in Mexico. Augustus' alibi to his wife (Wilson) is that he has purchased an interest in the oil wells and has been called there to look after them. The yacht is owned by a romantic married woman to whom Augustus is introduced as "Johnson." Boat owner Mrs. Dathis (Lorimer) carries on a flirtation with "Johnson" and invites him on another cruise.

Plans for the second cruise are foiled when the jealous Leon Dathis (Banks) finds out about the planned outing, and begins a search for "Johnson." To further complicate the plot, Mrs. Billings and her mother decide to accompany Augustus on his second trip. Caught, Augustus books passage on a steamer to Mexico and takes his wife and mother-in-law along. On the same boat goes the jealous Mr. Dathis. Meanwhile, Billy Lounsberry sells his oil wells to a Mr. Johnson (Geldart) and departs Mexico. Meanwhile, also on the steamer is a young woman Leonora (Hope) who is to marry this Mr. Johnson through a mail arrangement along with her father (Gastrock) and disappointed sweetheart Henry (Hackathorn). This leads to several difficulties, which are resolved, when the seven reach the Johnson oil wells. Augustus frees himself from his mother-in-law by marrying her off to the owner of the oil wells, Mr. Johnson.

Cast
Bryant Washburn as Augustus Billings
Lois Wilson as Mrs. Billings
Adele Farrington as Mrs. Batterson
Clarence Geldart as Joseph Johnson (credited as Charles H. Geldart)
Monte Blue as Billy Lounsberry
Monty Banks as Leon Dathis
Elsie Lorimer as Mrs. Dathis
Gloria Hope as Leonora Faddish
George Hackathorne as Henry McIntosh
Phil Gastrock as Francis Faddish

References

External links

Still photo during production (University of Washington, Sayre collection)
Lobby poster (archived on worthpoint)

1919 films
American silent feature films
Lost American films
Films directed by Donald Crisp
American films based on plays
1919 comedy films
Silent American comedy films
American black-and-white films
1919 lost films
Lost comedy films
1910s American films